The 2006 Texas Tech Red Raiders football team represented Texas Tech University as a member of the Big 12 Conference during the 2006 NCAA Division I FBS football season. Led by seventh-year head coach Mike Leach, the Red Raiders compiled an overall record of 8–5 with a mark of 4–4 in conference play, placing fourth in the Big 12's South Division. Texas Tech was invited to the Insight Bowl, where they defeated Minnesota in overtime. The Red Raiders played their home games at Jones SBC Stadium in Lubbock, Texas.

Schedule

Rankings

Personnel

Season summary

Baylor

Source: ESPN

References

Texas Tech
Texas Tech Red Raiders football seasons
Guaranteed Rate Bowl champion seasons
Texas Tech Red Raiders football